This is a list of Swedish signal regiments, battalions, corps and companies of the Swedish Army Signal Troops that have existed in the Swedish Army. They are listed in three ways, first by the actual units that have existed, then by the various names these units have had, and last by the various designations these units have had.

By unit 
S 1    Signalregementet (1937–1957)
S 1 B Signalkompaniet i Boden (1937–1954)   
S 1 K Signalkompaniet i Kristianstad (1942–1950)   
S 1 Sk Signalkompaniet i Skövde (1942–1961) 
S 1    Upplands signalregemente (1957–1974)
S 1    Upplands regemente (1974–2006)
S 2    Göta signalkår (1961–1962)
S 2    Göta signalregemente (1962–1984)
s 2    Göta signalbataljon (1984–1997) (part of Life Regiment Hussars (K 3)
S 3    Signalbataljonen i Boden (1954–1957)
S 3    Norrlands signalbataljon (1957–1987)
S 3    Norrlands signalregemente (1987–1994)
S 3    Norrlands signalkår (1994–2000)
Signbat/I 19   Norrland Signal Battalion (2000–2005) (part of Norrbotten Regiment (I 19)
LedR   Ledningsregementet (2007– )

By name 
Bodens signalkompani
Fälttelegrafkåren
Fälttelegrafkårens detachment i Boden
Göta signalbataljon
Göta signalkår
Göta signalregemente
Ledningsregementet
Norrlands signalbataljon
Norrlands signalkår
Norrlands signalregemente
Signalbataljonen i Boden
Signalbataljonen i Skövde
Signalregementet
Signalregementets kompani i Boden
Signalregementets kompani i Skövde
Upplands signalregemente
Upplands regemente
Upplands signalregementes kompani i Skövde

See also 
List of Swedish regiments
Military district (Sweden)
List of Swedish defence districts

References 
Print

Online

 
signal